Prachovice is a municipality and village in Chrudim District in the Pardubice Region of the Czech Republic. It has about 1,400 inhabitants.

Economy
Prachovice is known for limestone quarrying and cement production. About 1,700,000 tonnes per year is quarried.

References

External links

 

Villages in Chrudim District